Johnny Ray Huston (born June 1, 1961) is an American professional golfer who won seven PGA Tour events and currently plays on the Champions Tour.

Early life
Huston was born in Mt. Vernon, Illinois. He attended Auburn University in Auburn, Alabama and was a member of the golf team.

Professional career
Huston turned professional  in 1983. He won seven PGA Tour events and has had more than 80 top-10 finishes in his career. He has a history of being a "streaky" player, who either plays extremely well or mediocre. At the 1998 United Airlines Hawaiian Open, he broke a 53-year-old record for 72-hole scoring by shooting 260, a 28-under-par performance. Huston attributed his record-breaking score to magnets that he placed in his shoes and in the cover of his mattress.  He also had a course-record 61 at the 1996 Memorial Tournament. He finished in the top-100 on the money list every year but one during the first 17 years of his career.

Huston was a member of the winning inaugural Presidents Cup team in 1994 and the losing 1998 team. He is the first American golfer selected to two President Cups without a Ryder Cup.

Huston's best finish in a major championship was T-3 at the 1990 Masters Tournament; he also had a solo 4th-place finish at the 2000 U.S. Open. His peak Official World Golf Ranking was 15th in 1999.

Huston's first Champions Tour win was at the 2011 Dick's Sporting Goods Open, which was his third start and came just 25 days after he turned 50.

Huston has a reputation for playing very quickly. Commentator Gary McCord has described Huston as the Tour's fastest golfer, with no one a close second. He lives in Palm Harbor, Florida.

Professional wins (11)

PGA Tour wins (7)

PGA Tour playoff record (0–1)

Other wins (4)
1985 Florida Open
1987 PGA Tour Qualifying Tournament
1988 JCPenney Classic (with Amy Benz)
2005 Franklin Templeton Shootout (with Kenny Perry)

PGA Tour Champions wins (1)

PGA Tour Champions playoff record (0–1)

Results in major championships

CUT = missed the half-way cut
WD = Withdrew
DQ = Disqualified
"T" = tied

Summary

Most consecutive cuts made – 8 (1997 Masters – 1999 Open Championship)
Longest streak of top-10s – 1 (five times)

Results in The Players Championship

CUT = missed the halfway cut
WD = withdrew
"T" indicates a tie for a place

Results in World Golf Championships

1Cancelled due to 9/11

QF, R16, R32, R64 = Round in which player lost in match play
"T" = Tied
NT = No tournament

U.S. national team appearances
Professional
Presidents Cup: 1994 (winners), 1998

See also
1987 PGA Tour Qualifying School graduates
2008 PGA Tour Qualifying School graduates
List of golfers with most PGA Tour wins

References

External links

American male golfers
Auburn Tigers men's golfers
PGA Tour golfers
PGA Tour Champions golfers
Golfers from Illinois
Golfers from Florida
Dunedin High School alumni
People from Mount Vernon, Illinois
People from Palm Harbor, Florida
Sportspeople from the Tampa Bay area
1961 births
Living people